Jim Morris is a former professional baseball player and subject of the 2002 film The Rookie.

Jim or Jimmy Morris may also refer to:
Jim Morris (athlete)
Jimmy Morris (English footballer), English footballer
Jimmy Morris (Australian footballer) (1891–1971), Australian rules footballer
Jimmy Morris (hurler) (1896–1932), Irish hurler for the Galway senior team
Jim Morris (bodybuilder) (1935–2016), American bodybuilder
Jim Morris (baseball coach) (born 1950), head baseball coach at the University of Miami
Jim Morris or Hillbilly Jim (born 1952), former professional wrestler in the World Wrestling Federation
Jim Morris (playwright) (born 1953), English playwright
Jim Bob Morris (born 1961), American football player
Jim Morris (Ontario politician), former Canadian political candidate from the Natural Law Party of Canada
Jim Morris (record producer), record producer and engineer, owner of Morrisound Recording studios in Tampa, Florida
Jim Morris (film producer) (born 1955), American film producer and executive at Pixar and ILM
Jim Morris (rugby league) (1895–1988), Australian rugby league player
Jim Morris, whose US Army experience served as the basis for the film Operation Dumbo Drop

See also 
 James Morris (disambiguation)